The 2002 Africa One Antonov An-26 crash occurred on 26 July 2002 when an Africa One Antonov An-26 (9Q-CMC) faced a rejected takeoff at Kinshasa-N'Djili Airport in Kinshasa, Democratic Republic of the Congo. As a result of the aborted takeoff, the nose gear and the main gear legs collapsed. The aircraft was reportedly damaged beyond repair. No deaths or injuries occurred.

The accident aircraft, which had been carrying dozens of tons of freight goods, had been overloaded. The air company had only declared three tons of freight. Simplice Kibanza, the chairperson of the management committee of the Régie des Voies Aériennes de la République Démocratique du Congo (RVA), the DRC airspace regulatory agency, announced that as a result of the accident, the RVA created an emergency action plan to allow for the coordination of emergency services at N'Djili Airport in the event of an accident or incident. The airport previously had no such plan.

See also

 2007 Africa One Antonov An-26 crash

References

2002 in the Democratic Republic of the Congo
Accidents and incidents involving the Antonov An-26
Aviation accidents and incidents in 2002
Aviation accidents and incidents in the Democratic Republic of the Congo
July 2002 events in Africa
History of Kinshasa